Genann Mac Dala (modern spelling: Geanann), son of Dela (Dela was a descendant of Starn, son of Nemed), of the Fir Bolg was a legendary joint High King of Ireland with his brother Gann, succeeding their brother Rudraige. His wife was Cnucha.

When the Fir Bolg invaded Ireland the five sons of Dela divided the island among themselves. Genann landed with Rudraige at Tracht Rudraige (Dundrum Bay, County Down) and took the province of Connacht.

When their brother Rudraige died, Gann and Genann became joint High King for four years, until they both died of plague, along with two thousand of their followers, and were succeeded by Sengann.

Primary sources
 Lebor Gabála Érenn
 Annals of the Four Masters
 Geoffrey Keating's Foras Feasa ar Érinn

Legendary High Kings of Ireland
Fir Bolg